Virgil F13 (born 2008) is a rodeo bucking horse. He is specialized mainly in bareback bronc riding, but is sometimes used in saddle bronc riding. Although born in North Dakota, United States, he has lived most of his life in Alberta, Canada. Virgil is a two-time Professional Rodeo Cowboys Association (PRCA) Bareback Horse of the Year, as well as a two-time Canadian Professional Rodeo Association (CPRA) Bareback Bucking Horse of the Year. He won the award in both organizations in the same years; 2017 and 2018. He was also awarded the Bareback Horse of the Canadian Finals Rodeo (CFR) four times from 2015 to 2018, as well as the Bareback Horse of the National Finals Rodeo (NFR) in 2017. He is also the horse that was ridden for the highest-scored bareback ride in PRCA history, which occurred in 2022.

Background

Virgil was born in 2008, and is estimated to be 14 years old in 2022. Virgil is a grey gelding. He is the offspring of an 1,800 pound Percheron; Big John and a small 900 pound Appaloosa mare; Apples. Virgil was born and raised on the Dale Kling ranch in Grassy Butte, North Dakota. Dale gave the owner of the breeding stud Big John to John McNeely as payment for breeding fees but later sold him as a 2-year-old to Maury Tate at the 2010 Dale Kling's Breeders Classic bucking horse sale in Cody, WY. Maury sold him to Vern McDonald up in Lac La Biche, Alberta. He is owned by C5 Rodeo. "I paid a lot of money for him, but he got me a lot of rodeos," confessed Verne McDonald. He also won some trucks and four bareback awards.

Career
In 2018, multi-world-champion bareback bronc rider Kaycee Feild rode Virgil at the American Rodeo in Arlington, Texas. He rode Virgil to a winning round and a check for $433,333.

Richie Campion made a winning ride on Virgil at the Ponoka Stampede. He also made a winning ride at the 2017 Calgary Stampede. "We've all walked up there and been like, "Alright, gimme the grey,'" said Campion of the award-winning horse. "To reach in there and (draw him) … just … thank you, God. It's just crazy, you know? There's no rhyme or reason to snag him out of there. I'm a firm believer you draw what you're supposed to get on. I've been lucky to get on Virgil every time." He rode Virgil for 92.5 points, beating the next rider's score of 92 points.

At one NFR, in the 3rd round, Tim O'Connell was waiting a bit anxiously for his turn to ride Virgil. He had prepared to the best of his ability. After the ride was over, the score was 91.5 points. The scoreboard lit up a 90 point score for the fifth time. Bobby Mote was the last to do it. Twice, in 2008. "A world champion on a world champion at the NFR," Tim noted. "That's hard to top, especially when it works out the way it did."

In July, Jake Vold rode Virgil for 90.75 points at Ponoka, Alberta. That ride was the 4th highest score on bareback in 2017. Virgil bucked off Vold at the Canadian Finals Rodeo recently. In August, at Lynden, Washington, Austin Foss rode Virgil for 88 points to win. "He's a horse that bucks every time," Foss told the PRCA. "If a guy is doing his job you're going to win on him every time. That combo makes him obviously the riders' choice."

In January 2020, Will Lowe, a 3-time bareback riding world champion had an accident on Virgil. At the National Western Stock Show in Denver, Colorado, he spurred the horse four times, but then stopped and appeared to be trying to hang on. His hand was caught in the rigging. One of Virgil's hooves knocked him in the face. Once on the ground, the Justin Sports Medicine Team was assisting him. To everyone's relief, he was able to get up with assistance. Word came later that he had a facial laceration and trauma to his orbital bone. However, he would recover fine.

At the 2021 NFR, during Round 8, Layton Green scored 91 points riding Virgil. "It's awesome," said Green regarding this first-round win. "It's a really good horse, C5's (Rodeo) Virgil, and I don't know how many go-rounds they have won on him here, but I know it's quite a few in the bareback riding and the first one in the (saddle) bronc riding. That horse is everything a guy could ask for, big, strong, and really bucked today. Just super happy."

In 2021, Virgil was ridden a few times. Some of those rides resulted in 90-point scores. On April 25, at the Clovis Rodeo in Clovis, California, Tilden Hooper rode  him. On March 7, at the American Rodeo, Cole Reiner rode him. Saddle bronc rider Lefty Holman rode him at the Spanish Fork Fiesta Day Rodeo in Spanish Fork, Utah. He had an arena record 90.5 point ride on Virgil. C5 Rodeo was trying their bareback horse as a saddle bronc this year. "He's a phenomenal horse. He's big and strong . . . he's a big, intimidating sucker," Holman said of the 1,600-pound horse. "I was just the third guy to ride him with a saddle. I watched my good buddy Colt Gordon get on him and Rusty (Wright)." Both riders hit dirt, and Holman knew they would. Holman needed the win, and he earned 8,234.

On June 5, 2022, history was made when Virgil was ridden by Rocker Steiner (grandson of 1973 PRCA World Champion bull rider Bobby Steiner and son of 2002 PRCA World Champion steer wrestler Sid Steiner) in the championship round of that year’s PRCA Xtreme Broncs Riggin’ Rally in Darby, Montana. Not only did Steiner win the event, but he won it by riding Virgil for 95 points, the highest-scored bareback ride in PRCA history. The previous record was 94 points, which was set six times, beginning in 2002.

Summary 
Virgil's high score for 2018 was 91.5 points out of a possible 100 points. His average stock score is 45 points from a possible 50 points. He weighs 1,600 pounds. Virgil has won two Bareback Horse of the Year awards from the PRCA and two from the CPRA. He has won three trucks, and won a rider $100,000 at the Calgary Stampede. He was ridden for 94 points at RodeoHouston.

Awards
 2015-2018 Bareback Horse of the CFR
 2017 PRCA Bareback Horse of the Year
 2017 Bareback Horse of the NFR
 2017 CPRA Bareback Horse of the Year
 2018 PRCA Bareback Horse of the Year
 2018 CPRA Bareback Horse of the Year
Source:

References

Bibliography

External links
 Virgil: The Best Bucking Horse of All Time

2008 animal births
Horses in the United States
Rodeo horses